Choerophryne longirostris is a species of frog in the family Microhylidae. It is endemic to Mount Menawa in the Bewani Mountains of Papua New Guinea.
It inhabits the interior and edges of closed-canopy rainforest.

References

longirostris
Amphibians of Papua New Guinea
Endemic fauna of Papua New Guinea
Taxonomy articles created by Polbot
Amphibians described in 2001